The Sinuiju Formation(신의주 지질누층) is a geologic formation in North Korea. Formerly of uncertain age, it is now thought to be Early Cretaceous. Dinosaur remains diagnostic to the genus level are among the fossils that have been recovered from the formation. Compression fossils of insects are also known from the formation. Amphibian fossils, including frogs and lissamphibians, have also been found here.

Fossil content 
Fish
 Lycoptera sp.
 Acipenseriformes indet.

Amphibians
 Anuran (a frog, might be referred to Liaobatrachus grabaui).
Pterosaurs
 Anurognathidae indet.

Birds
 Confuciusornithidae indet. (known colloquially as the Archaeopteryx of Korea)
 Enantiornithes indet.
 Ornithurae indet.

Insects
 Angarosphex baektoensus
 Sinuijuhelorus baektoensis
 Sinuijus baektoensis
 Stellularis sinuijuensis
 Stenophlebia ryonsangensis
 Sinuijumantispa ryonsangiensis

Other invertebrates
 Eosestheria (a conchostracan)

See also 
 List of dinosaur-bearing rock formations
 List of stratigraphic units with few dinosaur genera

References

Bibliography 
  

Geology of North Korea
Lower Cretaceous Series of Asia
Aptian Stage
Barremian Stage
Sandstone formations
Siltstone formations
Mudstone formations
Lacustrine deposits
Paleontology in North Korea